Bombat Hendthi is a 1992 Indian Kannada-language comedy drama film directed by P. N. Ramachandra Rao and produced by R. Sriramulu. A remake of Rao's Telugu film, Chitram Bhalare Vichitram (1991), the film featured an ensemble cast including Shridhar, Ramesh Bhat, Sihi Kahi Chandru, Shruti, Abhinaya, Anjali and Tennis Krishna.  The film's music was composed by Upendra Kumar and cinematography is by Babji. The same story was remade in Tamil and released in 1995 as Aanazhagan.

Plot
Sridhar, Sihi Kahi Chandru, Ramesh Bhat and Tennis Krishna are good friends and stay together as tenants at Dhirendra Gopal's residence. After being thrown out of the house they start searching new house for rent but no one are ready to give their house for bachelors.

Finally, they land up in a place where the landlady insists on having a family as her tenants. The four bachelors dress up to be a man (Ramesh Bhat), his retarded brother (Tennis Krishna), his father (Sihi Kahi Chandru) and his wife (Shridhar). Later, Sridhar falls in  love with the landlady's daughter and all hell breaks loose.

Cast 

 Shridhar
 Ramesh Bhat
 Sihi Kahi Chandru
 Tennis Krishna
 Shruti
 Manju Malini
 Abhinaya
 Anjali
 Mukhyamantri Chandru
 Dheerendra Gopal
 Mysore Lokesh
 Vijay Kashi
 Dingri Nagaraj
 Mandeep Roy
 Atthili Lakshmi
 Shanthamma
 Bank Janardhan
 Srishailan
 Neegro Johnny

Soundtrack 
The music of the film was composed by Upendra Kumar with lyrics by R. N. Jayagopal.

References 

1992 films
1990s Kannada-language films
Indian comedy-drama films
1992 comedy-drama films
Kannada remakes of Telugu films
Cross-dressing in Indian films
Films scored by Upendra Kumar